This Woman's Heart is the second studio album from Chalee Tennison, released October 10, 2000 on Asylum Records.

Critical reception

People Magazine's website reviewed This Woman's Heart in its "Picks and Pans" and concluded with the following statement. "Bottom Line: A follow-up album with heart"

AllMusic's Maria Konicki Dinoia writes in her review that Chalee Tennison's "voice is so appealing and original and it makes every one of her songs worth listening to. She brings a welcome and refreshing sound to country music fans."

See original reviews for full article.

Track listing

Track information and credits taken from the album's liner notes.

References

External links
Asylum Records Official Site

2000 albums
Asylum Records albums
Chalee Tennison albums